Heinz Günthardt and Balázs Taróczy were the defending champions, but none competed this year. Taróczy opted to compete at Washington in the same week.

Anders Järryd and Tomáš Šmíd won the title by defeating Broderick Dyke and Michael Fancutt 6–4, 5–7, 7–6 in the final.

Seeds

Draw

Draw

References

External links
 Official results archive (ATP)
 Official results archive (ITF)

Dutch Open (tennis)
1984 Grand Prix (tennis)